Bineka may refer to:

 Bineka, Mandla, a village in Mandla district of Madhya Pradesh
 Bineka, Bhopal, a village in Bhopal district of Madhya Pradesh